The Randy Shilts Award is an annual literary award, presented by Publishing Triangle to honour works of non-fiction of relevance to the gay community. First presented in 1997, the award was named in memory of American journalist Randy Shilts.

Winners
 1997 — Anthony Heilbut, Thomas Mann: Eros and Literature
 1998 — David Sedaris, Naked
 1999 — John Loughery, The Other Side of Silence
 2000 — Eric Brandt, Dangerous Liaisons: Blacks, Gays and the Struggle for Equality
 2001 — Mark Matousek, The Boy He Left Behind: A Man's Search for His Lost Father
 2002 — [tie] Ricardo J. Brown, The Evening Crowd at Kirmser's; Robert Reid-Pharr, Black Gay Man
 2003 — Neil Miller, Sex Crime Panic
 2004 — John D'Emilio, Lost Prophet: The Life and Times of Bayard Rustin
 2005 — David K. Johnson, The Lavender Scare: The Cold War Persecution of Gays and Lesbians in the Federal Government
 2006 — Martin Moran, The Tricky Part: One Boy's Fall from Trespass into Grace
 2007 — Kenji Yoshino, Covering: The Hidden Assault on Our Civil Rights
 2008 — Michael Rowe, Other Men's Sons
 2009 — Kai Wright, Drifting Toward Love: Black, Brown, Gay and Coming of Age on the Streets of New York
 2010 — James Davidson, The Greeks and Greek Love
 2011 — Justin Spring, Secret Historian: The Life and Times of Samuel Steward
 2012 — Mark D. Jordan, Recruiting Young Love: How Christians Talk About Homosexuality
 2013 — Christopher Bram, Eminent Outlaws: The Gay Writers Who Changed America
 2014 — Hilton Als, White Girls
 2015 — Robert Beachy, Gay Berlin: Birthplace of a Modern Identity
 2016 — [tie] Barney Frank, Frank: A Life in Politics from the Great Society to Same-Sex Marriage and Michelangelo Signorile, It’s Not Over: Getting Beyond Tolerance, Defeating Homophobia, and Winning True Equality
 2017 — David France, How to Survive a Plague
 2018 — Eli Clare, Brilliant Imperfection
 2019 — Alexander Chee, How to Write an Autobiographical Novel
 2020 — Saeed Jones, How We Fight for Our Lives
 2021 — Eric Cervini, The Deviant's War: The Homosexual vs. the United States of America
 2022 — Brian Broome, Punch Me Up to the Gods

References

External links
 

Triangle Awards
American non-fiction literary awards
Awards established in 1997